Mariane Faith Ignacio Osabel (born January 28, 1998) is a Filipino singer and performer. She rose to fame when she participated in the third season of Tawag ng Tanghalan, a singing competition of the noontime show It's Showtime, and became a semifinalist. And later, she was the fourth grand champion of GMA's singing competition The Clash. She is currently a mainstay performer of the Sunday noontime variety show All-Out Sundays.

Early life 
Mariane Faith Ignacio Osabel was born on January 28, 1998, in Iligan City, Lanao del Norte. As a child until a young teen, she grew up and lived in Saudi Arabia from 2005 to 2011. Her elder brother, Arne Osabel, is also singer.

She finished from primary to secondary school at La Salle Academy, Iligan City, and her tertiary education in Mindanao State University–Iligan Institute of Technology (MSU-IIT), with Bachelor of Science (BS) in Environmental Engineering Technology (EnvET) and graduated in 2022.

Prior to joining Tawag ng Tanghalan and The Clash, she was the lead vocalist of Echoes Band, until her graduation in 2022, and was replaced by the late vocalist Maica Ramayan and other vocalists.

Career

2018–2019: Pre–Tawag ng Tanghalan and The Clash 
Before entering TV contests, she participated in Adlaw Sa Iligan Singing Star in 2018, and became grand champion of this season.

2019: Tawag ng Tanghalan and Prior to The Clash

Daily Rounds (First Attempt) 
On January 19, 2019, she participated in Quarter II in the third season of Tawag ng TanghalanIn her first performance, she sang "Bukas na Lang Kita Mamahalin by Lani Misalucha, where she emerged as the daily winner, and for her second performance in the Face-off Round, she sang "On the Wings of Love" by Kyla, but she lost to the defending champion.

Daily Rounds (Second Attempt) 
On July 8, 2019, six months after her losing in Quarter II, she returned in Quarter IV. In her first performance, she sang "I Am Changing" by Jennifer Holliday, where she emerged as the daily winner, and for her second performance in the Face-off Round, she sang "Fallin' by Alicia Keys, and became an defending champion. She continued to the fifth day making her the fifth semifinalist of the quarter. She remained the defending champion until her sixth day when she lost to the daily winner.

Semifinals 
During the weeklong semifinals, originally scheduled from June 24 to June 29, 2019 but rescheduled for August 26 to 31, 2019, Osabel performed songs corresponding to the theme of the day. She was followed by Shantal Cuizon, Alliyah Cadeliña, Jermaine Apil, Dior Lawrence Bronia, Julius Cawaling and Violeta Bayawa. On the sixth day, Osabel, had a combined average score of 57.03%. She failed to enter to the Grand Finals, and later she returned to the Ultimate Resbak round.

Ultimate Resbak 
After failing to enter to the Grand Finals, Osabel returned in the Resbak round and she sang "Who You Are", where she claimed the Seat of Power together with Windimie Yntong. On the fourth day, Osabel selected Mariko Ledesma in the Sing-off, where Osabel sang "Run to You" by Whitney Houston, but lost to Ledesma, who ascended to the Seat of Power, and then advanced to the final round.

2019–2020: Post–Tawag ng Tanghalan and controversial TNT winning announcement 
After the second round performance between Osabel and Mariko Ledesma, Ledesma took the seat of power, dethroning Osabel. However, after the winning moment, the screen appeared where the split scoring was revealed (showing the public and judges scores), and viewers noticed that Osabel's score given by the judges was 16.50%, while Ledesma received 50%. Due to the allegedly "rigged" results, netizens used #JusticeForMariane or #HustisyaParaKayMariane and it trended on Twitter, citing the expression, rants and sentiments over the score given by the judges.

On September 14, 2019, three days after the performances of Osabel and Ledesma, which aired on September 11, 2019, Tawag ng Tanghalan judge Dulce spoke about the controversial result of Ledesma dethroning Osabel, saying that Osabel sounded different live than what was broadcast, but failing to explain the impossibly low-scoring. Others involved said that the public didn't know what went on behind the scenes or the pressure the judges were under.

After the recent controversial result, Osabel withdrew from competing in the Final Resbak due to health problems, while Mariko, who was one of the grand finalist for Huling Tapatan, also withdrew her slot due to personal reasons caused by the netizens backlash against her. In 2021, according to a virtual interview in LionHearTV, Osabel became traumatized after not winning in TNT and she was afraid to join singing contests.

2021: The Clash 
In 2021, two years after her Tawag ng Tanghalan journey, and despite the controversy, she auditioned for the third season of The Clash, but she wasn't able to pass. She re-auditioned during Season 4 and finally received the call to compete for the fourth season.

Osabel participated in the fourth season of The Clash. She was dubbed as "Ultimate Siren ng Iligan City". On her One on One round, she sang "Paraisong Parisukat" by Basil Valdez, where she advanced on the second round. In the grand finals of the competition, she fought against Vilmark Viray on a one-on-one clash where she performed an original composition "Bakit Mahal Pa Rin Kita", composed by Harish Joya, while Viray performed "Umuwi Ka Na". Osabel ultimately became the grand champion of the fourth season of the Philippine reality singing competition The Clash.

2021–present: Post–The Clash 
After becoming grand champion of The Clash, Osabel is now a mainstay of All-Out Sundays, which is the segment of Queendom, together with Lani Misalucha, Julie Anne San Jose, Rita Daniela, Hannah Precillas, and her fellow The Clash graduates.

On March 3, 2022, Osabel signed a contract under GMA Music, together with The Clash Season 4 first runner-up Vilmark Viray.

Osabel signed a talent contract with Sparkle along with several other artists during the "Signed for Stardom" event on May 26, 2022.

Personal life 
Osabel has previous relationship with filmmaker, chief director, and entrepreneur Karl Timonera Orbe.

Health 
Osabel had her tonsils removed when she was 10 years old.

Filmography

Discography

Singles

Soundtrack

References

External links 
 
 https://www.gmanetwork.com/sparkle/artists/mariane_osabel
 

1998 births
Living people
21st-century Filipino women singers
Participants in Philippine reality television series
Reality show winners
GMA Network personalities
GMA Music artists
Filipino television variety show hosts